The Blue Meanies are a fictional army of fierce, buffoonish, music-hating beings and the main antagonists in the surreal 1968 Beatles animated film Yellow Submarine. They allegorically represent all the bad people in the world. Their visual appearance was mostly designed by Heinz Edelmann. Producer Al Brodax said that the Chief Blue Meanie resembled production coordinator Abe Goodman.

Description
The Blue Meanies are focused on the occupation and silencing of Pepperland — a colorful, musical utopia that lies beneath the sea. The Meanies have blue skin and claw-like, six-fingered hands. They wear black masks around their eyes and hats that resemble Mickey Mouse ears on their heads. They are humanoid in appearance — albeit with blue faces and very long noses.

History
The Blue Meanies arrive in Pepperland and do everything they can to oppress the peaceful, music-loving paradise. This prompts one of Pepperland's sailors, the former Commander, now-newly appointed Lord Admiral, "Old Fred" (or "Young Fred", according to the even older Lord Mayor) to escape in the Yellow Submarine of the title to find help. Old Fred journeys to Liverpool where he meets The Beatles, whom he enlists for help, because, as musicians, they would be able to restore harmony (and, indeed, melody) to Pepperland. The Meanies, in his absence, cause the lovely and colourful Pepperland to turn into a very grey, dull and oppressive place, wrought with thorns and thistles.

Later in the film, a Meanie abducts The Beatles' companion, Jeremy Hillary Boob, PhD, the so-called "Nowhere Man." When The Beatles arrive in Pepperland, the audience sees how the Meanies have laid waste to the former paradise and petrified the natives. The Beatles find Pepperland's confiscated musical instruments and their own doubles, Sgt. Pepper's Lonely Hearts Club Band, and bring music back to Pepperland. This restores colour to the hills and plants and life into the Pepperlanders (who had been petrified by various weapons in the Meanies' possession). With their spell thus broken, the Meanies cease to have a hold on Pepperland: even their guns start shooting flowers instead of missiles. Those that do not flee are invited by The Beatles to stay and "mingle" and they make peace with their former enemies.

Members

Chief Blue Meanie

The Chief Blue Meanie, also known as "His Blueness", is the leader of the Blue Meanies and the primary antagonist from the 1968 animated film Yellow Submarine.  A flamboyant character, with a high-pitched voice, he is set on conquering Pepperland and ruling with fear and oppression; he is a supreme despot given to psychotic tantrums and violent mood swings.  His most heinous of crimes from The Beatles' point of view, however, is his hatred of music.  He is voiced by Paul Angelis, who also provided the voice of Ringo Starr.

The Chief Blue Meanie arrives in Pepperland accompanied by Max, his assistant, and his large army of Meanies. He begins his campaign of terrorizing Pepperland by firing a massive glass ball at The Beatles' doubles, Sgt. Pepper's Lonely Hearts' Club Band, who play music in this peaceful and colorful world, where all the natives generally behave in a friendly manner towards one another.  As the Chief comments, "it can't last."  The soundproof glass sphere covers the band, making their music inaudible, and in their panic to run away, the natives are fired at by the Blue Meanies' guns, whose missiles both drain their victims' color on contact and seem to petrify them. The Chief bombards the natives with various weapons and other evil species that vary in their ferocity and eccentricity (as demonstrated after The Beatles' arrival to Pepperland, when a sharp-toothed "Snapping Turtle Turk" eats a young girl's paper windmill on purpose just to make her cry) that will reduce Pepperland's colorful hills and plants to bare thorns and thistles in a grey wasteland, with the only green existing in the form of giant apples that the "Apple Bonkers" pluck from trees to "bonk" on peoples' heads.

Later in the film, the Meanies kidnap The Beatles' friend and comrade, Jeremy Hillary Boob, also known as the "Nowhere Man". After The Beatles finally arrive in Pepperland, the Chief Blue Meanie is incensed when he sees the hills and trees returning to their proper colors at the sound of their music; he sends his fiercest weapon, "the Dreadful Flying Glove" after the heroes. The Glove is thwarted by The Beatles' song "All You Need Is Love", and the Meanies flee, knocking over the Chief in the process.

In a final, petty attempt at retribution, the Chief threatens to tear the newly-freed Nowhere Man into little pieces. However, he is thwarted by Jeremy's poetry and magic, sprouting roses from his nose and body. He flees with the rest of his army, unsure what to do now that "it's no longer a blue world"; Max suggests they flee to Argentina (a reference to the Nazis fleeing to Argentina after World War II). However, Jeremy's roses cause the Chief to have a change of heart, so he embraces the word "yes" and takes on the title "His Newness". He concedes defeat and decides to "mix" with The Beatles and the Pepperlanders. While Pepperland's Blue Meanies appear to have become peaceful, at the very end of the film, when The Beatles appear in the flesh to the audience, John says that "Newer and Bluer Meanies have been sighted within the vicinity of this theatre".

Personal characteristics
Like the other Blue Meanies, the Chief is masked, has yellowed teeth, wears a navy blue woolen suit and has massive, paw-like hands with six claws on each. He is taller than most of the other Meanies and whereas the "common" Blue Meanies wear a hat reminiscent of Mickey Mouse ears, his hat looks more like Oswald the Lucky Rabbit's. Also, whereas the "common" Blue Meanies wear orange-and-yellow striped stockings with Mary Jane shoes, he (and his assistant, Max) wear jackboots, complete with spurs: a pale blue boot on the right foot, a navy blue boot on the left. He has an unpredictable, if not split, personality, which sends him from apparently effeminate, quiet and friendly to loud, raging and malicious — though no less buffoonish in either. Max is often the victim of his abuse, being punched, shot or stomped on by a "Butterfly Stomper".  He also has another Meanie carry around a stool so that he can sit down whenever he likes; presumably, were he to fall on the ground, it would be at the stool-carrier's peril. He also states (until the very end, when he starts warming to The Beatles) that "we Meanies only take 'no' for an answer", and gets extremely angry at the sound of the word "yes", even when being answered in the affirmative. Sometimes his own aggression gets the better of him and he needs to be revived with "nasty medicine", which makes him even more eccentric than he already is. He encourages his army of Meanies to be as unpleasant as possible, but after admitting defeat, he later confesses that his cousin is "the bluebird of happiness".

Max
Max: Second-in-command of the Blue Meanies and the hapless majordomo to the Chief Blue Meanie, he wears a large bright red "M" insignia on his chest. Like the Chief Blue Meanie, he wears a hat with long rabbit-like "ears", (though his "ears" are colored blue instead of black) rather than the mouse-type worn by the other Meanies. He frequently incurs the wrath of the Chief Blue Meanie by making well-intentioned but unhelpful suggestions or comments at inopportune moments.

The Dreadful Flying Glove 
 The Dreadful Flying Glove: The fiercest of the Blue Meanies and their strongest weapon. Though there is only one Glove, it is a force to be reckoned with: crushing, squashing, or "o-blue-terating" whoever or whatever its master directs it to attack. It varies from being a right-handed glove to a left-handed one, depending on the situation, has a stylized face, with the thumbnail acting as the eye and the index finger as the nose, the middle finger and ring finger serving as its mouth (grinning teeth are clearly visible between these fingers). As it clenches itself into a fist, it covers up its eye, temporarily blinding it. The Glove also has an evil, sinister-sounding laugh in a low register. It is ultimately defeated when John sings "All You Need is Love" and entangles it in the letters of all the words that spring from his mouth as he sings.

The Four-Headed Bulldog 
 The Four-Headed Bulldog: A Blue Meanie Bulldog that is similar in appearance to Cerberus, the three-headed, dragon-tailed watchdog of the gates of Hades in Greek mythology; however, it has four heads, each one with very sharp teeth. It is extremely strong, and its handler is no match for it if it wishes to walk in a particular direction. It is ultimately defeated when The Beatles and Sgt. Pepper's Lonely Hearts Club Band sing "Hey Bulldog" and subject it to much taunting and trickery, which confuses and antagonizes it.

Types of Blue Meanies 
The Storm Bloopers, also known as the "Blue Menials" (the Boob refers to his captor as a "Blue Menial", though he may have simply been making a pun): These are the most numerous of the Blue Meanies. Like the Chief Blue Meanie and Max, they have navy blue woolly suits and domino masks, but wear Mickey Mouse-ear-like hats (instead of the type worn by the Chief and Max, whose hats look more like Goofy's ears). They have six claws on each hand, and wear yellow-and-orange striped tights and Mary Jane shoes (again, the Chief and Max are the exceptions here, as they both wear jackboots with spurs: a light blue boot on the right foot, a navy blue boot on the left). They also seem to be able to make their eyes glow so that they can see in the dark, which makes the head resemble a sort of movie projector. These particular Meanies carry guns that fire pale blue jagged arrows which, on contact, drain the victim's colour and petrify him or her – although it seems to do this to varying degrees or only temporarily, because several victims in the film are seen to cry, smile, or look up, and several natives of Pepperland are seen to back off at the sight of the Dreadful Flying Glove.
The Apple Bonkers: These are 15-foot tall, thin men who can walk from hill to hill at a stride, who wear purple tailcoats (with lapels), bow ties and top hats (with feathers in them). Their weapons of choice are giant green apples, which they drop on people's heads and which have the same effect as the jagged arrows.  If one can reach high enough, they, too, can be knocked out by such weapons, as The Beatles later discover. Singing is the only way to reverse the effect of being "bonked." They bear a slight resemblance to Victorian undertakers. Up close, their faces are more distinguishable: one Apple Bonker sports muttonchops, another sports a handlebar mustache and a curved goatee on his chin, and another sports just a mustache.
The Countdown Clowns: These are tall, fat clowns whose heads can spin around and around, and who give out loud shrieks when they are ready to attack or to sound an alarm to alert the Meanies. If their noses are pressed, which often makes a "squee" sound, an explosion goes off in the direction their faces are pointed. They have no hands or arms themselves, however, and so a Blue Meanie has to press their noses for them, often needing to prop a ladder up against them, or sit up on their shoulders when doing so, because they are very tall. When the Meanies' spell is broken, they end up simply producing positive words, such as "Yes" and "OK", in block capitals when they try to cause an explosion.
The Snapping Turtle Turks: Possibly the most pettily cruel creatures in the film, these are dressed like stereotypical Turkish men, sporting handlebar mustaches and curved goatees on their chins (they even sport curved Arabic shoes and fezzes). They are short and fat, and their stomachs are in fact oversized, predatory faces whose reptilian sharp-toothed mouths consume objects. We see one of them eating a little girl's paper windmill on purpose just to make her cry.
The Butterfly Stompers: These are wide, bullying creatures with cat-like faces. They each carry a number on their chest, and for whatever reason they find it entertaining to try to trample butterflies. One of them also stomps upon Max's head at the Chief's behest (or possibly mistaking it for a butterfly too). The trailer specifically names one of them as Robin.
The Hidden Persuaders: These are large, fat, bald, humanoids. They each smoke big cigars and carry a martini glass which appears to contain a floating eyeball instead of an olive. They have an extra hand inside their oversized wingtip shoes, which typically wields a pistol and shoots whenever the toe of the shoe is raised. If the shoe is closed at the right time, however, they can be made, quite literally, to shoot themselves in the foot. They are seen only briefly in the film. When the Meanies' spell is broken, we see them clinking their glasses together and using their third hands to shake.
The Jack-the-Nippers: They have mustaches, half-bald heads, green tailcoats and sunglasses, and have reptilian heads for hands. Much like the Snapping Turks' stomachs, these hands are used for fierce biting. They too are rarely seen, much like the Hidden Persuaders, and are never referred to by name – either 'Jack-the-Nippers' or 'Gator-Handed Men'. The name is a play on Jack the Ripper.

The Anti-Music Missile 
The Anti-Music Missile: This is seen used at the start of the film to initiate the attack on Pepperland. The Missile is a large blue-tinged bubble, which is launched from a silo hidden in the Blue Meanies' mountain. It is used to trap Sergeant Pepper's Lonely Hearts Club Band and silence their music. The citizens of Pepperland scream and run in panic when they see the Missile used, suggesting that it may have been used by the Meanies in a previous attack to silence the biggest source of music. The Missile/bubble is destroyed by Ringo, using the hole in his pocket which he took from the Sea of Holes. He utilizes the hole to free the Band trapped inside.

Other media
 The Beatles' posthumous music video "Free as a Bird" has a Blue Meanie briefly appearing.
 A Blue Meanie was seen in Lemon Demon's online video Ultimate Showdown of Ultimate Destiny.
 A Blue Meanie was seen as a doll in The Simpsons episode "The Bart of War". 
 Two Blue Meanies were in the South Park "Imaginationland" trilogy amongst the good creatures.
 Blue Meanies were featured in the film Across the Universe doing a dance with Mr. Kite, referred to as “the Blue People”.
 The Mad Mod transformed into a stylised "Union-Jack" Chief-like Blue Meanie temporarily during an episode of Teen Titans. He did this just after adjusting his rectangular sunglasses, suggesting some kind of hidden shapeshifting ability.
 Robot Chicken did a spoof of the movie The Hunt for Red October in the episode "Due to Constraints of Time and Budget" where a Blue Meanie submarine is trying to defect.
 The pro wrestler born Brian Heffron uses the ring name The Blue Meanie and his hometown is billed as "Pepperland." He has blue hair and also uses face paint to mimic the black outline around the eyes of the animated Blue Meanies.
 The Big Lez Show references Blue Meanies as a fictitious type of psychedelic mushroom in the episode "Choomah Island 2".

Other uses and cultural influence
 A boss enemy in Pathways into Darkness is called Big Blue Meanie.
 Mark Hamill has stated that the Chief Blue Meanie was an inspiration for the Joker in Batman: The Animated Series, with his light yellow teeth and high-pitched, piercing voice.
The Chief Blue Meanie's looks and personality was a major influence on the producers of The Powerpuff Girls to create one of the villains, an androgynous devil known only as "HIM". Coincidentally, one episode of the show involves 'Rainbow the Clown', a clown character who ends up transforming into 'Mr. Mime', a mime who drains Townsville of color and petrifies everyone (eventually even Blossom and Buttercup) until the Girls end up performing a musical number that undoes all of the chaos created by Mr. Mime.
 The Balinese psychedelic mushroom jamur tahi sapi, known for its blue underside and high concentrations of psilocin and psilocybin.
 A name given to members of the Alameda County Sheriff's Office after the 1969 events where, while wearing blue jumpsuits, the Sheriff's Office resorted to use of shooting tear gas into crowds of protesters in Berkeley, California's People's Park.
 In Stargate Universe, the Nakai aliens who kidnapped Chloe Armstrong and perform a series of repeated attacks attempting to capture the Destiny are referred to as the Blue Meanies.
 In Avengers: Endgame, Tony Stark briefly refers to the blue cyborg Nebula as "Blue Meanie".
 Blue Meanies were an American ska-core band founded in Carbondale, Illinois in 1989.
 In Vanishing Point, the police cars pursuing the main character's 1970 Dodge Challenger are referred to as Blue Meanies.
 The Gromble, a character on the 1990s cartoon Aaahh!!! Real Monsters, was said to be partially inspired by the Blue Meanies.
 Most of the characters in Altair in Starland were inspired by the Blue Meanies in appearance only.
 The "Time-Eaters" in the FX series Legion also bear a close resemblance to the Blue Meanies.
 Mini-Bot from Godrocks was inspired by the Blue Meanies with his behavior and voice.

See also
 Jeremy Hillary Boob

References

Film characters introduced in 1968
Fictional soldiers
MGM cartoon characters
The Beatles' Yellow Submarine